Tomasz Żyła (born 12 February 1967) is a Polish bobsledder. He competed at the 1998 Winter Olympics and the 2002 Winter Olympics.

References

1967 births
Living people
Polish male bobsledders
Olympic bobsledders of Poland
Bobsledders at the 1998 Winter Olympics
Bobsledders at the 2002 Winter Olympics
People from Lower Silesian Voivodeship